Hande Dalkılıç (born March 22, 1974, Ankara, Turkey) is a Turkish concert pianist.

Biography
She started her piano lessons with Prof. Güherdal Karamanoğlu Çakırsoy. She enrolled in the Bilkent University Faculty of Music and Performing Arts in 1989 and studied under Prof. Ersin Onay. She graduated from the Music Department in 1996 with first rank in the Faculty of Music and Performing Arts. She completed her master's degree in 1999 and Proficiency in Art degree in 2003. She has gained acclaim for her research nourished by her high artistic sensitivity starting from the earliest stages of her professional work. Her sister is Yasemin Dalkılıç, who is a world record-setting free-diver.

External links
Hande Dalkılıç official website

Turkish pianists
Turkish women pianists
Living people
Musicians from Ankara
1974 births
Bilkent University alumni
21st-century pianists
21st-century women pianists